The Moche Route is a tourist destination that begins in the Peruvian city of Trujillo  in what once was the seat of power of the Moche culture known as The Temples of the Sun and the Moon and then goes through a series of places that were part of the kingdoms Moche and Chimu. The route runs along the northern Peruvian mainly through  the regions called La Libertad and Lambayeque. In this route, are found the major archaeological sites in this area of Peru, belonging to the Moche culture. Recently the MINCETUR (Ministry of Tourism of Peru) has received the Ulysses Award for the promotion of this tourist route in 2011.

Sites of the route
Some places of the Moche route are:
 Huanchaco
 Huaca del Sol
 Huaca de la Luna, etc.
 Trujillo
 Chiclayo
 Lord of Sipan
 El Brujo
 Huaca Esmeralda
 The Lady of Cao
Pampa Grande

See also

 History of Peru
 Pre-Inca cultures
 Huaca de la Luna

References
 Art of the Andes, from Chavin to Inca.  Rebecca Stone-Miller, Thames and Hudson, 1995.
 The Incas and Their Ancestors: the archaeology of Peru.  Michael E. Moseley, Thames and Hudson, 1992.

Notes

External links
 www.huacas.com
 www.themocheroute.pe
 www.larutamoche.pe
 Sun and Moon Official Project information 
 Huaca del Sol placemarks Google Earth .kmz

Moche sites
Moche culture
Adobe buildings and structures
Archaeological sites in La Libertad Region
Archaeological sites in Peru